(Sir) Charlie Chaplin (KBE) (1889–1977) was an English-born internationally renowned Academy Award-winning actor, comedian, filmmaker and composer whose was best known for his career in Hollywood motion pictures between from 1914 until 1952, he subsequently appeared in two film's in his native England. During his early years in the era of silent film, he rose to prominence as a worldwide cinematic idol renowned for his tramp persona. In the 1910s and 1920s, he was considered the most famous person on the planet.

Chaplin was born in London and began acting on stage at the age of nine. In 1913, while on tour in the United States with Fred Karno's comedy group, he accepted a contract to work for Mack Sennett's Keystone film company. During his time at Keystone, he began writing and directing some of the films in which he starred. Chaplin signed with the Essanay Film Manufacturing Company in 1915, and the year after with the Mutual Film Corporation. In 1918, Chaplin began producing his own films, initially releasing them through First National Pictures and then through United Artists, a corporation he co-founded with Mary Pickford, Douglas Fairbanks, and D. W. Griffith. In the late 1940s and early 1950s, Chaplin was accused of being a Communist sympathiser, which he denied. He remained a British subject and, while travelling to England in 1952 to attend the premiere of his film Limelight, his American re-entry permit was rescinded. Chaplin eventually settled in Switzerland, where he remained for the rest of his life. He made his last two films in England.

During his lifetime, Chaplin received three awards from the Academy of Motion Picture Arts and Sciences. At the first Academy Awards ceremony, held on 16 May 1929, he was originally nominated for Best Actor and Best Director for The Circus (1928). The Academy dropped his two nominations, and he won an honorary award for writing, directing, producing, and acting. In 1972, he returned to the United States after nearly two decades to receive another honorary award, this time for his overall achievements in cinema. The following year, Chaplin's score for Limelight received the Academy Award for Best Music. Although 20 years old by this time, Limelight had not been released in the Los Angeles area until 1972, and had not been eligible for Academy Award consideration before then. Chaplin also received Academy Award nominations in 1940 for Best Actor and Best Original Screenplay for The Great Dictator. In 1942, Chaplin released a new version of The Gold Rush, taking the original silent 1925 film and composing and recording a musical score which was not released in 1925. The Gold Rush was nominated for Best Music (Scoring of a Dramatic or Comedy Picture). Notwithstanding the belated nomination for Limelight, his final contemporary nomination was in 1947 for his screenplay of Monsieur Verdoux.

As of 2020, seven of the films Chaplin starred in have been added to the American National Film Registry: Kid Auto Races at Venice (1914), The Immigrant (1917), The Kid (1921), The Gold Rush (1925), City Lights (1931), Modern Times (1936), and The Great Dictator (1940). Also selected was Show People (1928), which features Chaplin in an unbilled cameo appearance. For his work in motion pictures, Chaplin has a star on the Hollywood Walk of Fame.

Official films 

In 1964 Chaplin established his official filmography with the publication of his book, My Autobiography. The filmography consisted of 80 motion pictures released since 1914. Further detail was added to it in David Robinson's 1985 biography, Chaplin: His Life and Art, which included Chaplin's last film, A Countess from Hong Kong (1967), as the 81st entry. In 2010 the 82nd film was added with the discovery of A Thief Catcher, an early Keystone film hitherto thought lost.

All of Chaplin's films up to and including The Circus (1928) were silent, although many were re-issued with soundtracks. City Lights (1931) and Modern Times (1936) were essentially silent films, although they were made with soundtracks consisting of music and sound effects, with talking sequences in the latter film. Chaplin's last five films were all talking pictures. Aside from A Countess From Hong Kong, all of Chaplin's films were photographed in 35mm black-and-white.

Except where otherwise referenced, the release dates, character names, and annotations presented here are derived from Chaplin's autobiography, Robinson's book, and The Films of Charlie Chaplin (1965) by Gerald D. McDonald, Michael Conway, and Mark Ricci.

Keystone 
Chaplin appeared in 36 films for Keystone Studios, all produced by Mack Sennett. Except where noted, all films were one reel in length.

Essanay 
Chaplin wrote, directed, and starred in 15 films for the Essanay Film Manufacturing Company, all produced by Jesse T. Robbins. Except where noted all films are two-reelers.

Mutual 
Chaplin wrote, produced, directed, and starred in 12 films for the Mutual Film Corporation, which formed Lone Star Studios solely for Chaplin's films. All of the Mutual releases are two reels in length. In 1932, Amadee J. Van Beuren of Van Beuren Studios purchased Chaplin's Mutual comedies for $10,000 each, added music by Gene Rodemich and Winston Sharples and sound effects, and re-released them through RKO Radio Pictures.

First National 
Chaplin wrote, produced, directed, and starred in 9 films for his own production company between 1918 and 1923. These films were distributed by First National.

United Artists 
Chaplin began releasing his films through United Artists in 1923. From this point on all of his films were of feature length. He produced, directed, and wrote these eight films and starred in all but the first. Beginning with City Lights Chaplin wrote the musical scores for his films as well.

British productions 
In 1952, while travelling to England to attend the première of his film, Limelight, Chaplin learned that his American re-entry permit was rescinded. As a result, his last two films were made in England.

Other film appearances 
In addition to his official 82 films, Chaplin has several unfinished productions in his body of work. He made several cameo appearances as himself and was featured in several compilation films.

Uncompleted and unreleased films

Compilations 
Many Chaplin-unauthorized compilations of his Keystone, Essanay and Mutual films were released in the years following his departure from those companies. This is not an exhaustive list but does contain the most notable and widely released examples. Eventually Chaplin re-edited and scored his First National shorts for reissue in 1959 and 1975.

Cameos 
In addition to his own productions of A Woman of Paris (1923) and A Countess from Hong Kong (1967), Chaplin made cameo appearances as himself in the following films:

References 
Footnotes

Bibliography

Further reading

External links 
 
 Charlie Chaplin Collectors’ Guide at Brenton Film – History and background of Chaplin's film career, and worldwide listing of restored home video versions
 
  (Features public domain Chaplin films)

Charlie Chaplin Quotes on Yourfates

Male actor filmographies
Director filmographies
British filmographies